John Tankard (also known as Donatus) was Bishop of Killala.

Formerly, Archdeacon of the diocese he was elected on 13 June 1306, he was consecrated in 1307. He died in 1343.

References

1343 deaths
14th-century Roman Catholic bishops in Ireland
Archdeacons of Killala
Bishops of Killala
Medieval Gaels from Ireland
Year of birth unknown